The Korps Marechaussee te voet (literally "marshal corps on foot") were a colonial gendarmerie of the Royal Netherlands East Indies Army (KNIL), principally used for counter-insurgency in the Dutch East Indies.

History
On 26 May 1890 the Korps Marechaussee was established. The Corps task was counter-insurgency.

The Corps was commanded by European officers and consisted half of Ambonese and the other half of Javanese soldiers. The Korps Marechaussee were concerned with detecting and disabling the Acehnese enemy.

Aceh War

In 1898 Van Heutsz was proclaimed governor of Aceh, and with his lieutenant, later Dutch Prime Minister Hendrikus Colijn, would finally conquer most of Aceh. They followed Hurgronje's suggestions, finding cooperative uleebelang or secular chiefs that would support them in the countryside and isolating the resistance from their rural support base. The Dutch formulated a new strategy of counter-insurgency warfare by deploying light-armed Marechaussee units and using scorched earth tactics. Van Heutsz charged Colonel Gotfried Coenraad Ernst van Daalen with breaking remaining resistance. G.C.E. van Daalen destroyed several villages, killing at least 2,900 Acehnese, among which were 1,150 women and children. Dutch losses numbered 26, and Van Daalen was promoted.

In 1903, the main secular Acehnese resistance leaders including Sultan Muhammad Daud, Tuanku Raja Keumala, Mahmud and Muda Perkasa capitulated. By 1904 most of Aceh was under Dutch control, and had an indigenous government that cooperated with the colonial state. The Dutch consolidated their control over Aceh by practising a policy of religious tolerance as a means of dissuading the Acehnese from taking up an armed struggle. Nevertheless, episodes of marked Dutch military cruelty still occurred during this period. Photographs of a Dutch slaughter in Koeto Reh village of the Alas people taken during a Dutch military expedition in Aceh's Gayo and Alas regions in 1904, for example, indicate that killings of large groups of civilians occurred on some occasions. Estimated total casualties on the Aceh side range from 50,000 to 60,000 dead, and over a million wounded. The destruction of entire communities also caused 10,000 Acehnese to flee to neighbouring Malaya.

In the Netherlands at the time, Van Heutsz was considered a hero, named the 'Pacifier of Aceh' and was promoted to become governor-general of the entire Dutch Indies in 1904. A still-existent monument to him was erected in Amsterdam, though his image and name were later removed, to protest his violent legacy. The Dutch establishment defended its actions in Aceh by citing a moral imperative to liberate the masses from the oppression and backward practices of independent native rulers that did not meet accepted international norms. The Aceh War also encouraged Dutch annexation of other independent states in Bali, Moluccas, Borneo and Sulawesi between 1901 and 1910.
Colonial influence in the remote highland areas of Aceh was never substantial, however, and limited guerrilla resistance led by religious ulema persisted until 1942. Unable to dislodge the Dutch, many of the ulema gradually discontinued their resistance. The region of Gayo remained a center of resistance as late as 1914. One intellectual Sayyid Ahmad Khan advocated discontinuing the "jihad" against the Dutch since the term was used to define military warfare against religious oppression.

Elite corps
After 1890 the Corps continued as an elite corps of the KNIL;
Specialized in offensive surprise tactics;
Conducts intensive patrols deep into the jungle.

Lightly armed military police
The Korps Marechaussee were lightly armed, with klewang and carbine; allowing them to move quickly in the jungle. The carbine was a lightweight (three and a half pounds) and short (95 cm) weapon ideal for the typically small indigenous soldiers.

Tactical concept
Eventually the Royal Dutch East Indies Army (KNIL) took over the tactical plan of the Korps Marechaussee entirely. The trooper-carbine became, in 1912, the standard weapon of all native soldiers of the KNIL.

References
https://web.archive.org/web/20131102095205/http://www.defensie.nl/landmacht/cultureel/geschiedenis/het_leger_in_indi/oprichting_van_het_korps_marechaussee
http://www.defensie.nl/media/the_roots_klein_tcm46-154293.pdf

See also
Gotfried Coenraad Ernst van Daalen
Henricus Marinus Neeb
Aceh War
Kuta Reh massacre

Military history of Indonesia
Indonesia
Military units and formations of the Royal Netherlands East Indies Army
Dutch East Indies
Dutch conquest of Indonesia